Prahlad Bhagvanrao Shinde  (1933 – 23 June 2004), was a Marathi singer from Maharashtra. He was famous for devotional songs, Ambedkarite songs, and Qawwalis.

Early life
Shinde was born on 1933 in Pimpalgaon village of Ahmednagar to Bhagvanrao and Sonabai Shinde. He was the youngest child and had two elder brothers. He was introduced to music when he started accompanying his parents to do Kirtan and street singing to make the ends meet due to abject poverty. During his young age, he worked as a tabla player and chorus in Ismail Azad's Troupe and even got a chance to sing a small part in song Haider Ki Talvar. HMV gave a break to him when they release his first album which had four devotional songs. He went on to sing many Devotional and Folk songs which made him famous in Maharashtra. He also sang few Qawwalis.

Shinde family
Shinde married Rukminibai. Singers Anand Shinde, Milind Shinde and Dinkar Shinde are his sons. Adarsh Shinde, Utkarsh and Harshad, son of Anand, are his grandson. The Shinde family is influenced by B. R. Ambedkar and follows Buddhism.

Selected discography
His selected filmography is as below.

 Ashiqana Aur Nasihat Aamez Qawwali - 1975
 Ismail Azad Qawwal Ki Char Yaadgaar Qawwaliyan - 1990
 Pratham Namu Gautama - 1991
 Sai Mauli - 1995
 Mere Sai - 1996
 Tyagi Bheemraao - 1996
 Bheem Jwalamukhi - 1997
 Paule Chalati Pandharichi Vaat - 1997
 Vitthalachi Vaari - 1999
 Topiwalyan Ishara Kela - 2000
 Trisaran Ka Tika (Bheem Geet) - 2000
 Sampoorna Jagran - 2001
 Jejuricha Raja - 2001
 Mahima Mothaya Mahadevaacha - 2001
 Chala Jaau Aalandila - 2001
 Sanwalya Vitthla - 2001
 Pandhrila Jauni Yeto - 2001
 Bappa Moraya Re

Further reading

References

1933 births
2004 deaths
Singers from Maharashtra
Marathi people
Tabla players
People from Thane district
Indian Buddhists
20th-century Buddhists
21st-century Buddhists
Dalit artists
20th-century Indian male classical singers
Indian folk singers